The Caspian Flotilla is the flotilla of the Russian Navy in the Caspian Sea.

Established in November 1722 by the order of Tsar Peter the Great as part of the Imperial Russian Navy, the Caspian Flotilla is the oldest brown-water navy flotilla in the Russian Navy. In 1918, the fleet was inherited by the Russian SFSR then the Soviet Union in 1922, where it formed part of the Soviet Navy and was awarded the Order of the Red Banner in 1945. Following the collapse of the Soviet Union in 1991, the Caspian Flotilla and most of its vessels were inherited by the Russian Federation.

The Caspian Flotilla's headquarters are located in Astrakhan, but were historically in Baku (now in Azerbaijan) from 1867 until 1991, with additional facilities in Makhachkala (HQ being moved there) and Kaspiysk. The current commander is Rear Admiral Aleksandr Peshkov.

Establishment
The Caspian Flotilla (CF) was created in November 1722 in Astrakhan by the order of Peter the Great. Led by the admiral Fyodor Apraksin, it participated in Peter's Persian campaign of 1722–1723 and the Russo-Persian War (1804–1813), assisting the Russian army in capturing Derbent and Baku during the Persian Expedition of 1796. As a result of the Treaty of Gulistan of 1813, the CF remained the only military flotilla in the Caspian Sea. Baku became its main base in 1867.

Revolution
As the situation on the Caspian Sea stabilized in due course, the number of ships in the CF began to decrease. By the beginning of the 20th century, it had two gunboats and a few armed steamers. The sailors of the CF were actively engaged in the revolutionary movement in Baku in 1903–1905 and establishment of the Soviet authority in 1917 in that region. 

In order to provide assistance to the Red Army, they formed the Military Fleet of the Astrakhan Region (Военный флот Астраханского края, or Voyenniy flot Astrakhanskogo kraya) in April – June 1918, reinforced with torpedo boats and submarines from the Baltic Sea in the fall of 1918. On October 13, the Soviets renamed it to the Astrakhan-Caspian Military Flotilla (Астрахано-Каспийская военная флотилия, or Astrakhano-Kaspiyskaya voennaya flotiliya). The ships of the flotilla were captured by the counterrevolutionary Centrocaspian Dictatorship in August 1918 and later regained by the Soviets after the overthrow of the Musavat government.

Soviet era
In July 1919, the Astrakhan-Caspian Military Flotilla was combined with the Volga Military Flotilla (Волжская военная флотилия, or Volzhskaya voyennaya flotiliya) and renamed to the Volga-Caspian Military Flotilla (Волжско-Каспийская военная флотилия). On May 1, 1920, the Soviets established the Caspian Fleet, which comprised three auxiliary cruisers, ten torpedo boats, four submarines and other ships. 

Together with the Caspian Fleet, there was the Red Fleet of the Soviet Azerbaijan, stationed in Baku, as well. Both fleets completed the conquest of the Caspian Sea from the White Army. In July 1920, Caspian and Azerbaijani fleets were combined into the Naval Forces of the Caspian Sea (Морские Силы Каспийского моря, or Morskiye Sily Kaspiyskogo morya) and would later be renamed to the Caspian Flotilla on June 27, 1931.

During the Great Patriotic War of 1941–1945, the Caspian Flotilla secured vital sea shipping of army units, military equipment and different cargo, especially during the Battle of Stalingrad and the battle for the Caucasus. (During the war, some of the Lend Lease were shipped to the USSR via the Persian Corridor and the Caspian Sea).

During the Cold War the Caspian Flotilla was used to test missile armed ekranoplanes.

Post-Soviet era
Following the Dissolution of the Soviet Union, the fleet shrank, and the Kazakh contingent was removed to serve as a basis for Kazakhstan's naval service. For several years, Russia continued to lead a joint Turkmen-Russian force based at Astrakhan.

Among the Flotilla's units, from 2000, has been a new Naval Infantry brigade, the 77th, based at Kaspiysk. The headquarters and two battalions of the brigade were scheduled to be established by August 1, 2000. It was reported in June 2000 that the new brigade, which had inherited the lineage of the disbanded 77th Guards Motor Rifle Division, formerly with the Northern Fleet, was to have its troops housed in Kaspiysk and Astrakhan and have as many as 195 combat vehicles and one Gepard class frigate sent to it from Chukotka and the Northern Fleet, respectively. 

The brigade was to have helicopters added to it, according to the June 2000 report. The Brigade's full name was the 77th Detached Guards Moscow-Chernigov Order of Lenin, the Red Banner, Order of Suvorov Marine Brigade. It was disbanded in 2009.

The brigade comprised a headquarters at Kaspiysk; the 414th Detached Naval Infantry Battalion (Kaspiysk); the 725th Detached Naval Infantry Battalion (Kaspiysk); the 727th Detached Naval Infantry Battalion (Astrakhan); the 1200th Detached Reconnaissance Battalion (Kaspiysk); the 1408th Independent Howitzer Artillery Battalion; the 1409th Independent Howitzer Artillery Battalion; the 975th Detached Naval Infantry Battalion (Kaspiysk); the 1387th Detached Air Defence Missile and Artillery Battalion; and the 530th Detached Electronic Countermeasures Company.
 
Also, the flotilla has received 3 new Buyan-class stealth type river gunboats built by the St. Petersburg Almaz shipyard.
 
On November 13 and 23, 2009, there were two separate sets of explosions at the 31st Arsenal of the Caspian Sea Flotilla, an ammunition depot, in Ulyanovsk. Ten servicemen died. The depot was to be closed.

The first Russian warship equipped with the Caliber missile system entered service with Caspian Flotilla in 2012. On October 7, 2015, Russia's Defense Minister Sergey Shoigu announced that four Russian Navy warships in the Caspian Sea had fired a total of 26 Kalibr-class cruise missiles at the positions of the terrorist group ISIL in Syria.

Up to 2020, further enhancements in the capabilities of the Caspian Flotilla were announced. In 2019, it was announced that an aviation component would be added to its capabilities involving the deployment of Be-200 aircraft and Mi-14PB helicopters with the Flotilla. Further air support is drawn from 4th Air and Air Defence Forces Army (HQ: Rostov-on-Don) in the Southern Military District. In 2020, the deployment of the Bal coastal defence missile system with the Flotilla was also announced.

As of 2016, 85 percent of the Caspian Flotilla consists of modern ships and vessels. In 2014–2015, Flotilla received 3 Buyan-M missile corvettes, one modernized frigate and auxiliary vessels. On September 20, 2016, Rear Admiral Igor Osipov was replaced by Rear Admiral Sergey Pinchuk.

In Dagestan, a regiment of the marine infantry was formed on December 1, 2018, as part of the Caspian Flotilla (CFL) of the Southern Military District (YuVO).

To date, the new formation is fully staffed with modern weapons and military equipment, including BTR-82A armored personnel carriers, 120-mm self-propelled mortars 2S9 Nona, 122-mm howitzers D-30, unmanned aerial vehicles (UAV) "Eleron" and "Orlan".

On March 20, 2022, the Russian Defense Ministry claimed that ships of the CFL had fired Kalibr-class cruise missiles at a Ukrainian fuel and lubricant depot in Kostiantynivka, Mykolaiv Oblast, supported by air-launched Kh-47M2 Kinzhal hypersonic missiles.

Ships in service
Frigates
2 Gepard-class frigates, Tatarstan, Dagestan (active as of 2021)
Corvettes
3 Buyan-class corvettes, Astrakhan, Volgodonsk, Mahachkala 
3 Buyan M-class corvettes, Grad Sviyazhsk, Uglich, Veliky Ustyug (all active as of 2021)
1 Tarantul-class corvette R-101 Stupinets
Artillery boat
4 Gunboats Project 1204 Shmel Ak-209, Ak-223, Ak-201, Ak-248
Minesweepers
3 Sonya-class minesweepers German Ugryumov (former BT-244; in refit, returning to the fleet 2021), Astrakhanets (former BT-705), Magomed Gadzhiev (former BT-116)
2 Lida-class minesweepers RT-233, RT-234
3 Yevgenya-class small minesweepers RT-71, RT-302, RT-373
Patrol boats
3 Grachonok-class anti-saboteur ships
1 Raptor-class patrol boat (P-434)
Landing ship
1 Dyugon-class landing craft
1 Akula-class landing boats
6 Serna-class landing craft

References

External links
 The Russian Navy in the Caspian Sea: a new chapter via eurasian-research.org

Military units and formations established in 1722
Naval units and formations of the Soviet Union
Russian Navy
Russian fleets
Naval forces in the Caspian Sea
1722 establishments in the Russian Empire